The roughskin catshark (Apristurus ampliceps) is a species of catshark in the family Scyliorhinidae found near Australia and New Zealand. Its natural habitat is the open seas. This species belongs to a genus of poorly known deep-water catsharks.

This species was first described in 2008 by Ryohei Sasahara, Keiichi Sato & Kazuhiro Nakaya.

Very little is known of its biology. This species is known to occur in deep water (840 to 1,380 m) off New Zealand, sporadic sites around Tasmania, and a small area of Western Australia. Some concern exists for this species, as its distribution includes some heavily fished areas. Deep-water demersal trawl fisheries are expanding in the region, and assuming its biology is like other deep-water shark species, it may not be sufficiently fecund to withstand the exploitation pressure.

Conservation status 
The New Zealand Department of Conservation has classified the roughskin catshark as "Data deficient" under the New Zealand Threat Classification System.

References

External links
 Image of holotype specimen held at Museum of New Zealand Te Papa Tongarewa

roughskin catshark
Fish of New Zealand
Marine fish of Southern Australia
Taxa named by Ryohei Sasahara
Taxa named by Keiichi Sato (ichthyologist)
Taxa named by Kazuhiro Nakaya 
roughskin catshark
Taxonomy articles created by Polbot